Sack-O-Grande Acroport , also known as the Harbican Airport, (formerly 9XS9) was an airport in unincorporated Harris County, Texas, United States. It was located seven nautical miles (13 km) north of the central business district of the city of Katy, and seven nautical miles northeast of Houston Executive Airport.

The airport was closed in 2014 and is no longer listed on current FAA sectional maps.

The owner was Sack-O-Grande Incorporated, which was based in Hedwig Village, Texas.

Facilities 
It had one runway designated 9/27 with a 3,950 by 100 feet (1,204 x 30 m) turf surface.

References 

Airports in Harris County, Texas
Defunct airports in Texas
Airports disestablished in 2014